Brestov nad Laborcom is a village and municipality in the Medzilaborce District in the Prešov Region of far north-eastern Slovakia.

History
In historical records the village was first mentioned in 1434.

The name of the village is derived from brest, the term for "elm tree". 

The nad Laborcom epithet in the full modern name of the village means "upon-Laborec".

Geography
The municipality lies at an altitude of 218 metres and covers an area of 6.045 km². It has a population of about 66 people.

Genealogical resources

The records for genealogical research are available at the state archive "Statny Archiv in Presov, Slovakia"

 Roman Catholic church records (births/marriages/deaths): 1786-1898 (parish B)
 Greek Catholic church records (births/marriages/deaths): 1790-1911 (parish B)

See also
 List of municipalities and towns in Slovakia

External links
https://web.archive.org/web/20070513023228/http://www.statistics.sk/mosmis/eng/run.html
Surnames of living people in Brestov nad Laborcom

Villages and municipalities in Medzilaborce District